Mamata Kishan Kanojia (also spelled "Mamta" and "Mamatha"; born 3 January 1984), is a cricketer who has played for the India national women's cricket team. She has played seven One Day Internationals and four Twenty20 Internationals. She comes from Hyderabad.

Kanojia holds the record for missing the most consecutive matches for a team between appearances in Women's ODI history (99 matches on the trot over more than 8 years). According to the coach of the Hyderabad women's cricket team, she worked her way back into the national team through "hard work and determination".

References

Living people
India women One Day International cricketers
Hyderabad women cricketers
Indian women cricketers
Assam women cricketers
Railways women cricketers
India women Twenty20 International cricketers
1984 births